The American Red Cross Clubmobile Service was a mobile service club created during World War II to provide servicemen with food, entertainment and "a connection home." The Clubmobile was conceived by Harvey D. Gibson, a prominent New York banker and American Red Cross Commissioner to Great Britain, as a way to reach servicemen in airfields, camps and other theaters of war. All of the services provided by the Clubmobile were free, although some Clubmobiles began charging for food after 1942. The original Clubmobiles operated from late 1942 until 1946, traveling all throughout Great Britain and Europe. Women who volunteered for the Clubmobiles were popularly referred to as "donut dollies," since one of their biggest tasks was making doughnuts for the servicemen.

Vehicles 

The first Clubmobile was a British Ford in October 1942, and the vehicles were quickly outfitted by the women staffers who asked to be supplied with victrolas, records, gum, candy, cigarettes and first aid kits. In 1943, Clubmobiles were remodeled London Green Line buses driven by an English driver and operated by three American women. Each Clubmobile was fitted with a kitchen consisting of a built-in doughnut machine and a primus stove for heating water for coffee. One side of the kitchen opened out for serving food and drinks, while the rear of the Clubmobile consisted of a “lounge” area  with built-in benches that also doubled as sleeping bunks. The lounge also contained a Victrola with loud speakers, current music records, books, candy, gum and cigarettes.

For the Invasion of Normandy in June 1944, around 100 GMC trucks were converted into Clubmobiles, each of which was driven and staffed by three American women. Like the original Clubmobiles, these trucks were also fitted with mini-kitchens. After the invasion, ten groups of Red Cross Clubmobile girls with eight Clubmobiles per group were sent into France. From then on out, the Clubmobiles traveled with the rear echelon of the Army Corps and received their orders from the Army.

Staffers 
The Red Cross required the Clubmobile volunteers to be between the ages of twenty-five and thirty-five, have some college education and work experience, and to be “healthy, physically hardy, sociable and attractive." The women who worked the Clubmobiles were stationed in a town near American Army installations and traveled to a different army base each day. They learned how to make doughnuts and coffee in a Clubmobile kitchen, and would then drive around the base, chatting with the servicemen, handing out snacks, and playing music.

The Clubmobile volunteers continued their service throughout France, Belgium, Luxembourg and Germany until V-E Day in 1945, and provided limited service in Great Britain and Germany until 1946. A variation of the Clubmobiles would also operate during the Korean War. During the Vietnam War, a similar program operated as Supplemental Recreation Overseas Program.

References

Further reading
Korson, George (1945) At His Side: The Story of the American Red Cross Overseas in World War II. New York: Coward-McCann.
Madison, James H. (2007) Slinging Doughnuts for the Boys: An American Woman in World War II. Bloomington: Indiana University Press.
Madison, James H. (Fall 2007) "Wearing Lipstick to War: An American Woman in World War II England and France." Prologue (National Archives and Records Administration), 39 (3). Retrieved from https://www.archives.gov/publications/prologue/2007/fall/lipstick.html
Morgan, Marjorie Lee, ed. (1982) The Clubmobile - the ARC in the storm. St. Petersburg, FL: Hazlett Print. & Pub. 
Rexford, Oscar Whitelaw, ed. (1989) Battlestars & Doughnuts: World War II Clubmobile	Experiences Of Mary Metcalfe Rexford. St. Louis: Patrice Press.
Yellin, Emily (2004) Our Mothers' War: American Women at Home and at the Front During World War II. New York: Free Press.

External links 
 The Donut Dollies, a website dedicated to the story of the American women who volunteered to go to Vietnam to help the troops forget about the war.

American Red Cross
Volunteer organizations in the United States
United States in World War II
Women in World War II